Clube Atlético Jalesense, commonly known as Jalesense, is a currently inactive Brazilian football club based in Jales, São Paulo.

History
The club was founded on January 3, 1960. They won the Campeonato Paulista Série B2 in 2003.

Achievements

 Campeonato Paulista Série B2:
 Winners (1): 2003

Stadium
Clube Atlético Jalesense play their home games at Estádio Roberto Valle Rolemberg. The stadium has a maximum capacity of 5,000 people.

References

Inactive football clubs in Brazil
Association football clubs established in 1960
Football clubs in São Paulo (state)
1960 establishments in Brazil